This is a list of listed buildings in the parish of Cabrach in Moray, Scotland.

List 

|}

Key

See also 
 List of listed buildings in Moray

Notes

References
 All entries, addresses and coordinates are based on data from Historic Scotland. This data falls under the Open Government Licence

Cabrach